Formal theory can refer to:

 Another name for a theory which is expressed in formal language
 An axiomatic system, something representable by symbols and its operators
 A formal system
 Formal theory (political science), the theoretical modeling of social systems based on game theory and social choice theory, among other interdisciplinary fields